Hugh Weber is an American sports executive who has served as President of Business Operations for Seattle Sounders FC since February 2023. He previously served as President of Harris Blitzer Sports and Entertainment, whose properties include the  National Hockey League's New Jersey Devils and the National Basketball Association's Philadelphia 76ers.  Weber was previously President of the NHL's New Jersey Devils having served in the post since 2013. He previously served in the same position for the NBA's New Orleans Hornets.  A native of Tacoma, Washington, Weber graduated from the University of Puget Sound, where he competed on the track team.

References

Living people
Seattle Sounders FC
New Jersey Devils executives
Sportspeople from Tacoma, Washington
University of Puget Sound alumni
Year of birth missing (living people)